The Deadly Trackers is a 1973 American Western film directed by Barry Shear and starring Richard Harris, Rod Taylor and Al Lettieri. It is based on the novel Riata by Samuel Fuller.

Plot
Sheriff Sean Kilpatrick (Harris) is a pacifist. He is compelled to go against everything he has stood for to bring death to a gang of outlaws, led by the ruthless Brand (Taylor), to avenge the deaths of his wife and son, murdered by the gang when it robbed the bank in Kilpatrick's town. In Mexico, his hunt is challenged by his noble sheriff counterpart (Lettieri), who is interested only in carrying out the law - not vengeance.

Cast
 Richard Harris as Sheriff Sean Kilpatrick 
 Rod Taylor as Frank Brand 
 Al Lettieri as Gutierrez, Mexican Policeman 
 Neville Brand as Choo Choo 
 William Smith as Schoolboy 
 Paul Benjamin as Jacob 
 Pedro Armendáriz Jr. as Herrero 
 Isela Vega as Maria 
 Kelly Jean Peters as Katharine Kilpatrick 
 William Bryant as Deputy Bill 
 Sean Marshall as Kevin Kilpatrick 
 Read Morgan as Deputy Bob 
 [Joan Swift as Teacher 
 Ray Moyer as Priest 
 Armando Acosta as Mole

Production
The film began as the project, Riata, written and directed by Sam Fuller, starring Richard Harris and Bo Hopkins. Production was halted during filming and then reassembled with a new director and cast, with Harris the only member of the original cast to return.

According to costar Rod Taylor, Harris hated Fuller's script and walked out on the original production. Once Taylor signed on, he contributed to the re-write (Taylor was a member of the Screenwriters Guild) by adding scenes to flesh out his villainous character. It was through Harris' relentless drive that the film was completed at all, even using musical outtakes from other movies to cobble together the score.

See also
 List of American films of 1973

References

External links

The Deadly Trackers at the Complete Rod Taylor site

1973 films
British Western (genre) films
Films directed by Barry Shear
1973 Western (genre) films
Warner Bros. films
American Western (genre) films
1970s English-language films
1970s American films
1970s British films